The men's portion of the 1948 United States Olympic trials for track and field was held at Dyche Stadium on the campus of Northwestern University in Evanston, Illinois. Organized by Amateur Athletic Union (AAU), the two-day competition lasted from July 9 to 10.

The results of the event determined qualification for the United States at the 1948 Summer Olympics held in London.

1948 U.S. Olympic track and field trials results

Men

Women
The women's Olympic trials were conducted on July 12 as a single day event in Providence, Rhode Island.  It was considered horribly organized, or at least the women athletes were not accorded the same respect as the men in the sense that they had to conduct heats, semi-finals and finals all in the same day.  Audrey Patterson ran five races that day to qualify in two events.  Lillian Young ran three races and long jumped.

References

External links
USA Track and Field

USA Outdoor Track and Field Championships
US Olympic Trials
Track, Outdoor
United States Summer Olympics Trials
Sports in Evanston, Illinois
United States Olympic Trials (track and field)